The Hartford Commercial Historic District encompasses about two blocks of buildings in the central business district of Hartford, Arkansas.  Extending on the east side of Broadway from just north of Main Street to south of Ludlow Street, they are the only major commercial buildings left from Hartford's boom years of 1880–1920, when coal in the area was mined for use by the railroads.  Most of the buildings are single-story brick structures, in typical early-20th-century commercial styles.  Included in the district is Hartford's present city hall, which was built in 1910 as a theater.

The district was listed on the National Register of Historic Places in 2009.

See also
National Register of Historic Places listings in Sebastian County, Arkansas

References

Historic districts on the National Register of Historic Places in Arkansas
Buildings designated early commercial in the National Register of Historic Places
Sebastian County, Arkansas
National Register of Historic Places in Sebastian County, Arkansas